Jadubai Jorat is an Indian Marathi language comedy series which aired on Zee Marathi. It starred Nirmiti Sawant and Kishori Shahane in lead roles.

Cast 
 Nirmiti Sawant as Jui
 Kishori Shahane as Mallika
 Vighnesh Joshi
 Siddharth Khirid
 Anand Kale
 Jayant Savarkar
 Pradeep Joshi
 Sanjivani Samel
 Sanchita Kulkarni
 Amey Borkar
 Yogita Chavan
 Pradnya Jawale
 Vanita Kharat
 Parth Ghatge

Reception

Special episode (1 hour) 
 17 September 2017

Airing history

References

External links 
 
 Jadubai Jorat at ZEE5

Marathi-language television shows
2017 Indian television series debuts
Zee Marathi original programming
2018 Indian television series endings